USS Princeton may refer to:

, a screw sloop, launched and commissioned in 1843, the first screw-driven vessel in the Navy and the subject of a fatal gun explosion in 1844
, a transport and training ship, launched in 1851 and commissioned in 1852
, a gunboat launched in 1897 and commissioned in 1898
, a light aircraft carrier, commissioned in 1943, sunk at Leyte Gulf in 1944
, an aircraft carrier commissioned in 1945, serving in the Korean War and Vietnam War, reclassified LPH-5 in 1959, decommissioned 1970
, a guided missile cruiser commissioned in 1989, currently in active service

United States Navy ship names